Liverpool is a city and port in Merseyside, England, which contains many listed buildings.  A listed building is a structure designated by English Heritage of being of architectural and/or of historical importance and, as such, is included in the National Heritage List for England.  There are three grades of listing, according to the degree of importance of the structure.  Grade I includes those buildings that are of "exceptional interest, sometimes considered to be internationally important"; the buildings in Grade II* are "particularly important buildings of more than special interest"; and those in Grade II are "nationally important and of special interest".  Very few buildings are included in Grade I — only 2.5% of the total.  Grade II* buildings represent 5.5% of the total, while the great majority, 92%, are included in Grade II.

Liverpool contains more than 1,550 listed buildings, of which 28 are in Grade I, 109 in Grade II*, and the rest in Grade II.  This list contains the Grade II listed buildings in the L3 postal district of Liverpool.  The area covered by this postal district comprises a varied infrastructure.

It is bounded to the west by the River Mersey, along which are a series of docks, no longer used for their original purpose of transporting cargo.  These are centred on what has become an area of tourist attractions, the Pier Head and Albert Dock.  The dockland area stretches to the north as far as Wellington Dock, and to the south to Brunswick Dock.  The listed buildings associated with the docks include their retaining walls, sea walls, graving docks, warehouses, gates, huts, and structures providing hydraulic power.  Moving inland, the area covers most of the commercial district of the city, and the southern end of the residential districts of Vauxhall and Everton. Streets covered in the district include Mount Pleasant, up to the area of the University of Liverpool, and along London Road and Pembroke Place to the Royal Infirmary.  The listed buildings in these areas include offices, residential buildings, a former convent, a hospital, memorials, a school, and university buildings.

Grade II listed buildings from other areas in the city can be found through the box on the right, along with the lists of the Grade I and Grade II* buildings in the city.

Buildings

See also

Architecture of Liverpool

References
Notes

Citations

Sources

External links
 Liverpool City Council listed buildings information page

Buildings in Liverpool 03
Listed buildings in Liverpool 03
Liverpool-related lists